Etalocib is a drug candidate that was under development for the treatment of various types of cancer. It acts as a leukotriene B4 receptor antagonist and a PPARγ agonist.

Clinical trials were conducted measuring efficacy for treatment of non-small cell lung cancer and pancreatic cancer and the inflammatory conditions asthma, psoriasis, and ulcerative colitis, but were suspended due to lack of efficacy.

References

Leukotriene antagonists
Salicylic acids
Phenol ethers
Fluoroarenes
Abandoned drugs
Biphenyls